VSG Altglienicke is a German sports club based in the locality of Altglienicke in the borough of Treptow-Köpenick of eastern Berlin. VSG Altglienicke is a multi-sports club, which besides its football department, also offers its members volleyball, handball, bowling, seniors activities and gymnastics. Its football team plays in the fourth tier Regionalliga Nordost.

History 
VSG acknowledges the role of several local Altglienicke sides in the club's history. The first of these is MTV Spiess founded in 1883 out of a gymnastics club formed in mid-century. As was common at the time the club had a nationalistic, martial character. This sports association soon adopted handball, a legacy passed on to the modern day club.

Two other local clubs, Altenglienicker Arbeiter- und Turnsportverein (also known as Bewegungsclub Freiheit) and Altglienicker Ballspielclub were formed in 1906. Each of these clubs had football departments with AATSV also having an athletics section. All three associations were active through to 1933 when the membership of AATSV appears to have been dispersed to the other clubs.

After World War II occupying Allied authorities banned all existing organizations in Germany, including sports and football associations. Sports clubs were soon reformed and in 1948 Altglienicker Sportverein emerged bringing together the memberships of the old clubs in one association. By 1951 the club had constructed a new stadium, but was also under pressure from East German sports authorities to merge with BSG Chemie Adlershof. They were able to resist this move but were forced into a name change, becoming Volkssport Gemeinschaft Altglienicke, which was deemed to be more politically correct. The club was also able to deflect a second attempt at amalgamation in the 60s, this time with BSG Fernsehen. After the reunification of the country the club voted to retain its identity as VSG rather than once again becoming ASV.

The club played in the tier five NOFV-Oberliga Nord in 2013–14 but, at the end of season, voluntarily withdrew to the Berlin-Liga despite finishing seventh in the league. They returned to the Oberliga in 2016 after a league championship in the Berlin-Liga, and were promoted to the Regionalliga Nordost the following year.

Controversy 
VSG found itself embroiled in controversy after second-team players were alleged to have made anti-Semitic remarks and fans chanted and displayed similarly offensive slogans during a Kreisliga-B Berlin match against TuS Makkabi Berlin in October 2006. The match was ordered replayed after Makkabi left the field in protest in the 78th minute and Altglienicke directed to play its next two matches before empty stands. Team managers and players were also required to attend anti-racism seminars or face a ban from playing in any Berlin league.

Current squad

Honours

Regional
 Regionalliga Nordost (IV)
 Runners-up: 2019–20, 2020–21
 NOFV-Oberliga Nord (V)
 Winners: 2016–17
 Berlin-Liga (VI)
Winners: 2011-12, 2015–16
 Runners-up: 2010-11

Cup
 Berlin Cup
 Winners: 2020

Stadium 
The club has traditionally played it home matches at the Stadion Altglienicke (capacity 2,500).

References

External links
 

Football clubs in Germany
Football clubs in Berlin
Football clubs in East Germany
Association football clubs established in 1948
1948 establishments in Germany